Lucas Andrés Mugni (born 12 January 1992) is an Argentine footballer who plays as a midfielder for Campeonato Brasileiro Série A club Bahia.

Club career

Colón
Mugni began his career at Gimnasia y Esgrima de Ciudadela at the age of 5. He went on to play for Club Atlético Colón at age 9 playing with the youth categories up to the first division. He made his debut in the First Division on 2 May 2010 for Colón in a goalless draw against Atletico Tucuman at age 18. With the arrival of Roberto Sensini who gave him continuity in the starting lineup, due to his strong performances he took hold of the team and was given the number 10 jersey. On 25 March 2012 he scored his first goal in the first division in Colon's victory against Independiente by 3–0. He scored his first international goal in a Copa Sudamericana match against Racing Club.

Flamengo
In January 2014, the midfielder moved to Flamengo for the amount of U$1.25 million.

Mugni debuted for Flamengo on February 5, 2014 against Boavista-RJ, his team won 5-2 in the 2014 Campeonato Carioca.

On March 23, 2014 Lucas scored his first goal for Flamengo against Cabofriense.

On 24 August 2014, Mugni scored his first Série A goal. He came to the match as a substitute on a 2-0 win against Criciúma in Heriberto Hülse Stadium. He scored on a penalty kick which he also suffered.

In 2015, Mugni was loaned to Newell's Old Boys, returning to Fla in the following year. On 11 January 2017, Mugni and Flamengo agreed in a mutual contract termination, closing his period of little success in the Brazilian club.

Gaziantepspor
After resigning his contract with Flamengo Lucas signed in January 2017 with Turkish club Gaziantepspor until the end of 2017-18 season. The transfer got cancelled before the contract officially got signed.

Rayo Majadahonda
On 17 March 2017, Mugni signed for Spanish club Rayo Majadahonda.

Later career
Mugni subsequently represented Everton de Viña del Mar, Lanús, Oriente Petrolero, Sport Recife, Gençlerbirliği and Bahia.

International career
Mugni has represented Argentina at the U-17 and U-20 level. In September 2012, Alejandro Sabella selected Mugni to the full national team for the first leg match against Brazil in the 2012 Superclásico de las Américas, although he did not feature in the match.

Career statistics

Honours
Flamengo
Campeonato Carioca: 2014

References

External links
  
 Player profile 
 

1992 births
Living people
Association football midfielders
Argentine footballers
Argentine expatriate footballers
Club Atlético Colón footballers
CR Flamengo footballers
Newell's Old Boys footballers
Everton de Viña del Mar footballers
Club Atlético Lanús footballers
Oriente Petrolero players
Sport Club do Recife players
Gençlerbirliği S.K. footballers
Esporte Clube Bahia players
Argentine Primera División players
Campeonato Brasileiro Série A players
Campeonato Brasileiro Série B players
Chilean Primera División players
Süper Lig players
Expatriate footballers in Brazil
Footballers from Santa Fe, Argentina